An indirect election for the President of Kosovo were held on January 9, 2008. Though not scheduled for 2008, the election of the president by the Assembly of Kosovo was brought up as an issue after the technical resignation of Fatmir Sejdiu from the position.

Fatmir Sejdiu's actual term would end in 2009, but according to a coalition concord that his party, the Democratic League of Kosovo (LDK), signed with the Democratic Party of Kosovo (PDK), the leading party in parliament, he agreed to “re-legitimise” his position. His resignation was the only practical way to end his term, and thus doing so, he enabled himself for a completely new term. Kosovo's Constitutional Framework contains no provision as to term limits or incapacitation of rerunning of the resigning president.

The two candidates Fatmir Sejdiu and Naim Maloku of the Alliance for the Future of Kosovo (AAK) received votes as follows:
First round: 62 and 37 respectively
Second round: 61 and 37 respectively
Third round: Fatmir Sejdiu is elected after receiving 68 votes.

References

RTK - Zgjedhja e Kryetarit dhe Qeverisë së Kosovës

Presidential elections in Kosovo
Kosovo
Presidential election
January 2008 events in Europe